Loutsa (Greek Λούτσα, plural Loutses) may refer to the following places in Greece:

 Loutsa, old name of Artemida, East Attica
 Loutsa, Euboea, a settlement in the municipal unit of Dirfys, Euboea
 Loutsa, Preveza, a community of Fanari, Preveza regional unit
 Loutses, a village in the municipal unit of Thinali, Corfu